The 1902–03 season was the 32nd season of competitive football in England.

Events
Aston Villa win 12 of their last 15 games to finish one point behind champions The Wednesday.

Honours

Notes = Number in parentheses is the times that club has won that honour. * indicates new record for competition

League tables

First Division

Second Division

References